Lophiotoma polytropa is a species of sea snail, a marine gastropod mollusk in the family Turridae, the turrids.

Description
The length of the shell attains 45 mm, its diameter 18 mm.

The shell is concavely shouldered, forming a somewhat muiltispiral spire, sharply ridged throughout, the two ridges forming the shoulder more prominent. The color of the shell is yellowish to brownish, the ridges dark chestnut. (described as Pleurotoma fascialis)

Distribution
This marine species occurs off the Philippines; the Moluccas and off New Caledonia.

References

External links
 Helbling G. S. (1779). Beyträge zur Kenntniß neuer und seltener Konchylien. Aus einigen Wienerischen Sammlungen. Abhandlungen einer Privatgesellschaft in Böhmen, zur Aufnahme der Mathematik, der vaterländischen Geschichte, und der Naturgeschichte, 4: 102-131, pl. 1-4
 Puillandre N., Fedosov A.E., Zaharias P., Aznar-Cormano L. & Kantor Y.I. (2017). A quest for the lost types of Lophiotoma (Gastropoda: Conoidea: Turridae): integrative taxonomy in a nomenclatural mess. Zoological Journal of the Linnean Society. 181: 243-271
 Gastropods.com: Lophiotoma (Lophioturris) polytropa

polytropa
Gastropods described in 1779